Balleigh is a small village, 0.5 miles southeast of Edderton and 7 miles west of Tain, in eastern Ross-shire, Scottish Highlands and is in the Scottish council area of Highland.

References

Populated places in Ross and Cromarty